Steven Galloway is an American politician from Montana. He is a Republican member of the Montana House of Representatives for district 24.

References

Republican Party members of the Montana House of Representatives
Politicians from Great Falls, Montana
Year of birth missing (living people)
Living people